Gary Lakes (born September 26, 1950) is an American opera heldentenor. 

Lakes was born in Woodward, Oklahoma, and raised in Irving, Texas.  He made his professional debut with the Seattle Opera in the role of Froh in 1981 in Wagner's Das Rheingold, after attending Southern Methodist University where he studied with Thomas Hayward.  He was a high school football defensive tackle, but switched his career aspirations to singing after a cracked vertebra derailed any hope for a football career.  He debuted with the Metropolitan Opera on February 4, 1986 as the High Priest in Mozart's  Idomeneo and soon after sang the role of Walther in Wagner's Tannhäuser.  In 1987, he sang the role of Siegmund in Wagner's Die Walküre with the Met.  He sang the role of Siegmund on both the Met's DVD and CD of  Die Walküre opposite Jessye Norman as Sieglinde with James Levine conducting.   Other roles he has sung at the Met include Don Jose in Bizet's Carmen, Samson in Saint-Saëns' Samson et Dalila, the Emperor in Strauss' Die Frau ohne Schatten, Erik in Wagner's Der fliegende Holländer, Grigory in Mussorgsky's Boris Godunov, Florestan in Beethoven's Fidelio, the title role in Wagner's Parsifal, Laca in Janáček's Jenůfa, Aeneas in Berlioz' Les Troyens and Jimmy Mahoney in Weill's Rise and Fall of the City of Mahagonny.

Other Wagner roles he has sung at various opera houses include Tristan in Tristan und Isolde, Siegfried in Götterdämmerung and the title roles in Tannhäuser and Lohengrin. Other roles have included Admete in Gluck's Alceste, Herod in Strauss' Salome, the title role in Berlioz' La damnation de Faust and concert performances of Beethoven's Ninth Symphony and Gustav Mahler's Lied von der Erde.  Besides Siegmund, he has recorded the roles of Bacchus in Strauss' Ariadne auf Naxos and Aeneas in Les Troyens, and also albums of Irish songs and ballads (in English).  He appeared on The Tonight Show with Jay Leno on January 14, 1993.

Lakes is a fellow of the Music Academy of the West, where he attended in 1977.

References

1950 births
Musicians from Dallas
American operatic tenors
Living people
Classical musicians from Texas
Music Academy of the West alumni
Singers from Texas